Avast Secure Browser (formerly Avast! SafeZone) is an Avast Software web browser included for optional installation in the Avast Antivirus installer since 2016, but it is also available on its website. It is based on the open source Chromium project. It is available for Microsoft Windows, macOS, iOS, and Android.

Avast Online Security is an extension for Google Chrome, Microsoft Edge, Mozilla Firefox and Opera browsers that has some similar features to Avast Secure Browser.

Events

2016 
24 March 2016 – Avast! SafeZone Browser was launched

2018 
6 April 2018 – Renamed to Avast Secure Browser and revamped

History
Initially, Avast Secure Browser was bundled with paid versions of Avast Antivirus. In March 2016, Avast started bundling it with the free version as well. Avast Secure Browser was originally called "SafeZone" before being revamped and rebranded as "Avast Secure Browser" in early 2018.

Before the revamp and rename, SafeZone's design was similar to that of the Opera browser. SafeZone turned on automatically when the user visited financial or shopping sites to conduct online transactions.

In December 2015, Tavis Ormandy identified a security vulnerability that could allow hackers to insert malicious JavaScript code into the browsers of Avast SafeZone Browser users. Avast quickly deployed a temporary fix and repaired the vulnerability a few days later.

Features

 Video Downloader: A plug-in that offers to download videos being watched by the user on selected websites. It allows the user to choose video quality and, in some cases, to download the soundtrack of the video as an audio file.
 Anti-tracking and anti-fingerprinting: The software prevents the collection of information about the user's computer or browsing history that could be used to build a profile of the user.

See also
 Comparison of web browsers
 List of web browsers
 Comparison of antivirus software

References

External links
 Official Website

Secure Browser
Software based on WebKit
Windows web browsers
Web browsers
2018 software
Gen Digital software